The D. B. Hardeman Prize is a cash prize awarded annually by the Lyndon Baines Johnson Foundation for the best book that furthers the study of the U.S. Congress in the fields of biography, history, journalism, or political science. Submissions are judged on the basis of five criteria: (1) contribution to scholarship, (2) contribution to the public's understanding of Congress, (3) literary craftsmanship, (4) originality, and (5) depth of research. Members of the national selection committee are: Senator Tom Daschle; Lee Hamilton, Director of The Center on Congress; Thomas Mann of The Brookings Institution; Leslie Sanchez of Impacto Group; and Nancy Beck Young of The University of Houston.

D. Barnard Hardeman, Jr. (1914–1981) was a politician, political scholar, journalist and teacher. He graduated from the University of Texas and the University of Texas Law School and served in the U.S. Army during World War II. Hardeman served in the 52nd and 54th Legislatures representing Grayson and Collin counties in the Texas House of Representatives.  Between 1958 and 1961, he worked as an assistant to Sam Rayburn, Speaker of the House, and was Rayburn's official biographer.  An avid bibliophile whose book collection numbered more than ten thousand volumes, Hardeman bequeathed his collection of American biographies and political history to the LBJ Presidential Library in Austin, Texas.

Recipients

References

External links 

History of the United States Congress
American literary awards
Recurring events established in 1980
1980 establishments in the United States
Awards established in 1980